Xu Yang (born 27 June 1970 in Jiangsu) is a retired Chinese high jumper.

He won the silver medals at the 1993 and 1995 Asian Championships and the bronze medal at the 1994 Asian Games. He also competed at the 1991 World Championships and the 1992 Olympic Games without reaching the final.

His personal best jump is 2.31 metres, achieved in September 1993 in Beijing.

References

1970 births
Living people
Chinese male high jumpers
Athletes (track and field) at the 1992 Summer Olympics
Olympic athletes of China
Asian Games medalists in athletics (track and field)
Athletes from Jiangsu
Asian Games bronze medalists for China
Medalists at the 1994 Asian Games
Athletes (track and field) at the 1994 Asian Games
20th-century Chinese people